The Byblos bronze spatulas are a number bronze spatulas found in Byblos, two of which were inscribed. One contains a Phoenician inscription (known as the Azarba'al Spatula, KAI 3 or TSSI III 1) and one contains an inscription in the Byblos syllabary.

They were published in Maurice Dunand's Fouilles de Byblos (volume I, 1926–1932, numbers 1125 and 2334, plate XXXII).

Spatulas
The spatulas discovered in Dunand's Fouilles de Byblos volume I are as follows:

Inscribed

 1125 (the Azarba'al Spatula) Large bronze spatula with a short stalk (9.5 x 5.6cm). Phoenician inscription of six lines on one side. On the other side, some chisel test marks. Published separately in 1938 as Spatule de bronze avec épigraphe phénicienne du XIIIe siècle (now dated to the tenth century). Text of the inscription:

{| class="wikitable"
|+ 
|- 
| (1) || [...]Y L'ZRB'L || [...] to Azarba'al
|- 
| (2) || TŠ'M Š<Q>LM KSP  || ninety she<q>els of silver.
|-
| (3) || NŠBT 'M NḤL || Let us share. If you inher-
|-
| (4) || TNḤL MGŠTK || it (obtain) it, your portion
|-
| (5) || 'LK WMGŠT || will be yours, and my portion
|-
| (6) || 'LY || shall be mine.
|}
   
 2334. Bronze spatula (7 x 4.5cm), similar to no. 1125. Inscribed in the Byblos syllabary. Vertical lines apparently separate the words, as in archaic Phoenician inscriptions.

Uninscribed
 1345 Small bronze spatula (6.5 x 1.5mm), badly ruined
 2333 Bronze spatula (10.5 x 4.4cm), similar to no. 1125 but without inscription
 3227. Narrow triangular spatula (8 x 2cm), in bronze
 3313 Bronze spatula (7.7 x 2.6cm), with square stem

Bibliography
 Dunand, Maurice, 'Spatule de bronze avec épigraphe phénicienne du XIIIe [actually: Xe] siècle', in: Bulletin du Musée de Beyrouth 2 (1938) 99–107. 

 B. Donnelly-Lewis (2021), The Azarba'al Spatula (KAI 3), A Debt Receipt from Ancient Byblos: Linguistic Notes for a New Translation and Interpretation, Semitica

 Shea, W. H. 1977 The Byblos Spatula Inscription, JAOS 97.2: 164-170
 Ranck, T. E. 1973 The Byblos Spatula, an Ancient Bribe or Peace Offering. Australian  Journal of Biblical Archaeology 2: 45-50

 P. Kyle McCarter, Jr. and Robert B. Coote, "The Spatula Inscription from Byblos," BASOR 212 (1973): 19-21
 Christopher Rollston, "The Dating of the Early Royal Byblian Phoenician Inscriptions: A Response to Benjamin Sass."  MAARAV 15 (2008): 57–93.
 Benjamin Mazar, The Phoenician Inscriptions from Byblos and the Evolution of the Phoenician-Hebrew Alphabet, in The Early Biblical Period: Historical Studies (S. Ahituv and B. A. Levine, eds., Jerusalem: IES, 1986 [original publication: 1946]): 231–247.
 William F. Albright, The Phoenician Inscriptions of the Tenth Century B.C. from Byblus, JAOS 67 (1947): 153–154.

References

Phoenician inscriptions
Collections of the National Museum of Beirut
Archaeological artifacts